Bready Cricket Club is a cricket club located in the village of Magheramason, County Tyrone, Northern Ireland, playing in North West Senior League 1. The club are the current holders of the North West Senior Cup.

Previously a successful intermediate club, the club achieved senior status in 1974.

It was selected as a venue to host matches in the 2015 ICC World Twenty20 Qualifier tournament and for three Twenty20 International matches between Ireland and Scotland.

Honours
Ulster Cup: 1
2014
North West Senior League: 2
2018, 2021
North West Senior Cup: 2
1996, 2011

References

External links
Bready Cricket Club

Cricket clubs in Northern Ireland
North West Senior League members
Cricket clubs in County Tyrone